Eduart is a 2006 Greek drama film directed by Angeliki Antoniou. It was Greece's submission to the 80th Academy Awards for the Academy Award for Best Foreign Language Film, but was not accepted as a nominee. It was also entered into the 29th Moscow International Film Festival.

Cast
 Eshref Durmishi as Eduart
 André Hennicke as Christoph
 Ndriçim Xhepa as Raman
 Ermela Teli as Natasha
 Adrian Aziri as Elton
 Gazmend Gjokaj as Pedro
 Manos Vakousis as Giorgos Harisis
 Edi Mehana as Ali

See also
List of submissions to the 80th Academy Awards for Best Foreign Language Film

References

External links

Eduart in the director's official website: photos, trailer, awards, reviews
Ronald Bergan, Eduart and the Thessaloniki International Film Festival guardian.co.uk
Spyros Payiatakis, Kathimerini, about Eduart

2006 films
2000s Greek-language films
2006 drama films
Greek drama films